Arun Barun O Kiranmala (also known as: Arun-Barun-Kiranmala) is a 1979 Indian Bengali-language fantasy film, directed by Barun Kabasi and produced by Dolphin Films. It is based on Dakshinaranjan Mitra Majumder's collection of fairy tales, Thakurmar Jhuli.

Plot
Arun, Barun and Kiranmala are orphaned siblings. One day they go in search of their parents. They first visit the Jogini Durbar where they are helped with magical items like a golden stick. Then they go to Maya Puri where they find fairy spirits trapped by the witch of the Maya Puri. After overcoming many hurdles they finally kill the witch and help the fairy spirits to escape. The fairies then promise to tell them about their parents in return. The  children are taken for lunch to the Jogini Durbar where the king of Arabia also joins them. It is soon discovered that the three children are the children of this king. The five fairies reveal how the sister of the king's wife played tricks and set the three children afloat in the river for which the king punished his wife and banished her from the palace. The story ends with a happy reunion as Arun, Barun & Kiranmala find their parents and all live happily ever after.

Cast
Tarun Kumar
Dilip Ray as the King
Master Partho as Arun
Master Supratim as Barun
Tapati Manna as Kiranmala
Jnanesh Mukhopadhyay
Nimu Bhowmik
Satya Bandyopadhyay
Alpana Goswami
Chhaya Debi
Padma Devi
Jhumur Gangopadhyay

References

External links
 Arun-Barun-Kiranmala at Gomolo

1979 films
Bengali-language Indian films
Indian fantasy films
1970s Bengali-language films
1970s fantasy films
Films based on Indian folklore
Films based on fairy tales